Design Museum Brussels is a museum located in Heysel Park, Brussels, Belgium. The space focuses on design works from the 20th and 21st centuries.

History

Arnaud Bozzini is the director of the museum.

The museum was established in 2015 through the purchase of a private collection.

It was previously known as The ADAM (Art and Design Atomium Museum).

In 2015 the museum opened The Plasticarium which focuses on the use of plastic in the design industry the mid-20th century through to the present day.

In 2016 the museum exhibited 240 previously unseen photographs by Charles and Ray Eames.

In 2020 the museum opened Belgisch Design Belge, a permanent exhibition space dedicated to the history and practice of design in Belgium.

The size of the museum is 5,000 m2 and it received c. 126,000 visitors in 2019.

References

External Links 
 Design Museum Brussels

Museums with year of establishment missing
Museums in Brussels
Decorative arts museums in Belgium
Design museums